Xinwuri is a railway station in Wuri District, Taichung, Taiwan served by Taiwan Railways. It is connected to Taichung HSR station via a bridge, and also has a connection to Taichung HSR Station metro station.

Overview
The station consists of a large building linked to the HSR station via a bridge. There are automatic ticketing machines and ticketing staff, shops, and restaurants within the building. Bus stations and parking facilities are shared with the HSR station.

Station layout

Around the station
 Rainbow Village

See also
 List of railway stations in Taiwan

References

External links

Xinwuri Station (Chinese)

Railway stations served by Taiwan Railways Administration
Railway stations in Taichung
Railway stations opened in 2006